The 2010 Shonan Bellmare season was their first season back in the top flight, J. League Division 1 after 10 seasons, and 25th season overall in the Japanese top flight. It was also the first season in which they participated as an autonomous club and not as a works team of Fujita Engineering, their original parent company until 1999, whose lack of support caused them to be relegated that year.

Competitions

Player statistics

Other pages
 J. League official site

Shonan Bellmare
Shonan Bellmare seasons